Foluwashola Ameobi (born 12 October 1981) is a Nigerian former professional footballer who played as a striker.

He spent 14 years at Newcastle United, making 397 official appearances and scoring 79 goals, and received a winner's medal when they won the Championship in 2010. He has the second most appearances as a substitute in the Premier League. On leaving Newcastle in 2014, he briefly represented Gaziantep BB in Turkey, before brief spells at Crystal Palace, Bolton Wanderers, Fleetwood Town, and Notts County.

Born in Nigeria but raised in England, Ameobi was capped by the England under-21 team before making his Nigeria debut in 2012 and representing them at the 2014 FIFA World Cup.

Early life
Born in Zaria, Nigeria to a family from Ijumu Local Government Area in modern-day Kogi State. Ameobi moved to Fenham, Newcastle upon Tyne, England when he was five. His initial promise was spotted whilst attending the Walker Central Boys Club, before he was invited to attend Newcastle United's Academy.

Club career

Newcastle United

Early career
Ameobi signed a pre-contract with Newcastle on 1 July 1997. He progressed through the youth setup, making his debut in the reserves in 1998 on 11 October against Sunderland. He made his first team debut two years later, on 9 September 2000, in a home game against Chelsea. He went on to make 22 appearances for Newcastle that season, in lieu of the injured Alan Shearer and Carl Cort.

The 2002–03 Champions League saw some of Ameobi's finest performances including an equalising goal against Barcelona in a 3–1 defeat at the Nou Camp as well as scoring two goals against Bayer Leverkusen in a 3–1 victory.

His erratic form has earned him some criticism in the past, and although never having been claimed as a prolific goalscorer, many of his games were as a substitute. Due to injuries in the latter stages of the 2005–06 season, Ameobi gained a regular starting place, and scored six goals in Newcastle's last 12 Premier League games.

In the 2006 UEFA Intertoto Cup, Ameobi scored twice in Newcastle's away tie at Lillestrøm SK (3–0), taking him to second place in the club's table of leading goalscorers in European competition with twelve goals, behind only Shearer.

Injury, loan, and transfer attempts
During the 2006–07 season, Ameobi needed a hip operation, a problem which had been plaguing him for two seasons. Newcastle's shortage of match-fit first team strikers during the previous season had forced him to postpone this surgery. The problem eventually forced Glenn Roeder to send Ameobi for surgery two months before the transfer window, making the 0–0 draw away game to Manchester City his last game and ruling him out for the rest of the season. He had made 13 appearances (three as a substitute) and scored five goals.

Ameobi and the Newcastle medical team reported his hip operation in the United States was a success and that the club doctors and medical staff would work on his rehabilitation. It was originally thought that he would not be fit to play until the start of the 2007–08 season, but his rehabilitation progressed quickly and he returned with three games remaining in the season, clocking approximately 30 minutes of match action against Reading and making a further two appearances.

However, after failing to impress Newcastle manager Sam Allardyce, or Kevin Keegan on 27 March 2008, Ameobi agreed a loan deal with Stoke City until the end of the season, to help their promotion campaign. It is understood that a loan fee of around £500K was agreed and that a possible permanent transfer was also discussed subject to Stoke winning promotion. Ameobi made his debut for Stoke against Sheffield Wednesday on 29 March, the game ended 1–1. After playing for six games and not managing to score despite Stoke's gaining of promotion, Ameobi returned to Newcastle, and Stoke decided not to sign him permanently.

On 14 August, Ipswich Town manager Jim Magilton confirmed that the club were in talks with Ameobi and that the club were keen to get the deal finalised as long as Ameobi was willing to play in the Championship. However, on 17 August, Ameobi failed a medical, showing hamstring problems, and the deal collapsed.

Return to fitness

Due to long-term injuries to Mark Viduka and Alan Smith, as well as shorter term injuries to Michael Owen and Obafemi Martins, Ameobi was able to start the 2008–09 season in the first team squad. He managed to score his first goal in two years for Newcastle in a 2–2 home draw with Manchester City on 20 October. After the match, interim manager Joe Kinnear praised Ameobi and backed him to kick-start his career. He followed this up with a goal in his next game away to Sunderland in a 2–1 defeat on 25 October. He signed a new deal with the club in January 2009 to keep him contracted until 2012.

He scored a penalty to mark his 50th goal for Newcastle on 1 February 2009 against local rivals Sunderland to make the final score 1–1. He scored his first ever career hat-trick in Newcastle's first home match in the Championship against Reading on 15 August. The first two goals were diving headers, and he completed his hat-trick with a penalty, which he placed in the bottom left corner, sending the keeper the wrong way. He scored in the next game in a 1–0 victory over Sheffield Wednesday taking his tally to four goals in three games, equalling his total for the previous season. Following these early season performances he was named the Championship player of the month for August.

He got injured in Newcastle's 4–3 win over Huddersfield Town in the League Cup. The injury kept him out for three months but on his return he scored against Coventry with a left footed strike from the edge of the box. He followed this up by scoring the second in Newcastle's 2–0 home win over Middlesbrough and their 2–2 away draw with Sheffield Wednesday on Boxing Day taking his tally to an impressive 8 goals from 9 starts. Ameobi was subsequently sidelined with a hamstring injury but made the bench against Nottingham Forest on 29 March 2010. Ameobi appeared early in the second half as a substitute, and soon made his presence felt, firing in an angled left-footed shot off the post to give United the lead in a 2–0 victory. On 3 April 2010, Ameobi scored the decisive goal in a 3–2 victory at Peterborough United.

On 22 September 2010 Ameobi scored two goals in a surprise victory away at Chelsea in the League Cup, including the winner in the 90th minute. On 16 October 2010, Ameobi came off the bench to score Newcastle's first in a 2–2 draw against Wigan Athletic. After his good performance against Wigan, he started the next game against West Ham United alongside Andy Carroll putting in a good performance as The Magpies came from 1–0 down to win 2–1. He scored twice in Newcastle's next league game on 31 October 2010 as Newcastle crushed local rivals Sunderland 5–1 at St. James' Park. On 2 January 2011, he scored the winner in a 1–0 win at Wigan Athletic.

Despite suffering with a cheek bone injury in February which required him to wear a mask which impaired his vision upon his return, he was a regular starter after Christmas with the sale of Andy Carroll. He signed a contract extension to the end of the 2013–14 season on 10 August 2011. His current deal was due to expire at the end of the season.

Later career
In the 2011–12 season, Ameobi became something of a fringe player, with the arrival of Demba Ba and later, Papiss Cissé, pushing him onto the substitutes bench. But on Sunday 16 October 2011, against Tottenham, Ameobi, a 71st-minute substitute for Leon Best, scored a goal late on to make it 2–2. The next few games were an annoyance for Ameobi, with Ba finding his shooting boots and pairing well with Best and with Ameobi's inclusion in the starting line-up against Norwich ending up in a 4–2 defeat. On 4 March, Ameobi was yet again on the bench for a game against Sunderland, and brought on as a substitute for Cissé he scored a 91st-minute equaliser to get Newcastle back on terms and bringing his tally to 7 goals in 12 games against Sunderland for Newcastle, a record only bettered by Jackie Milburn. His prolific goal scoring form against Sunderland has led many sections of the Newcastle support to refer to him as "The Mackem Slayer". His next league goal came nine months later, in a 1–0 win over QPR on 22 December.

During Newcastle's Europa League campaign, Ameobi scored three goals in the competition; the opening goal in a 3–0 win over Bordeaux on 4 October 2012; the equaliser in a 2–2 draw with Club Brugge on 8 November 2012, and the only goal of the game from the penalty spot to secure a 1–0 aggregate victory over Metalist Kharkiv on 21 February 2013.

Ameobi scored in a 2–0 win over Morecambe in the second round in the League Cup (with his younger brother scoring the second goal) on 28 August 2013. Ameobi's next goal would come in the league when he scored the opening goal in a 2–1 home loss to Swansea City on 19 April 2014, and he also scored the opening goal in a 3–0 win over Cardiff City. On the final day of the season and also, his final appearance for Newcastle, Ameobi was sent off for dissent in a 2–1 away loss to Liverpool.

On 23 May 2014, it was confirmed by Newcastle United that they would be parting company with Ameobi after 14 years of service for the Tyneside club.

Gaziantep BB
On 11 August 2014, Ameobi signed for Turkish club Gaziantep Büyükşehir Belediyespor on a one-year contract. He made his debut on 13 September, in a goalless draw against Kayserispor, playing the full match and getting booked in the third minute. He scored his first goal through a 35th-minute penalty in the 1–1 draw with Adanaspor on 19 September.

Ameobi left the club on 29 December 2014, citing family reasons for his departure. He made 11 appearances and scored 4 goals during his time there.

Crystal Palace
On 29 January 2015, Ameobi returned to the Premier League by signing for Crystal Palace until the end of the season. He was signed by Alan Pardew, his last manager at Newcastle. On 21 February 2015, he made his debut for the club after being substituted on for Joe Ledley in the eightieth minute against Arsenal.

In June 2015, Ameobi was released by Crystal Palace on expiry of his contract.

Bolton Wanderers
On 23 October 2015, Ameobi signed for Championship side Bolton Wanderers on a short-term contract and was handed the number 26 shirt. He made his debut a day later coming on as a 12th-minute substitute replacing Gary Madine in a 1–1 draw against Leeds United, in which Ameobi gave Bolton the lead in the 32nd minute. He left the club after his contract ended following Bolton's 3–1 victory over MK Dons in which he scored in the 90th minute on 23 January 2016. Following the end of this contract, Ameobi offered to play for Bolton for free but Bolton were unable to do this, due to being under a transfer embargo.

Fleetwood Town
On 12 February 2016, Ameobi signed for Fleetwood Town until the end of the season, and was handed the number 9 shirt.

Notts County
On 3 February 2017, Ameobi signed for Notts County until 30 June 2017. On 20 June 2017, Ameobi signed a new contract with the club.

He was released by Notts County at the end of the 2017–18 season.

Return to Newcastle United and new role 
Ameobi returned to Newcastle United on 22 June 2019 as the club's first ever loan manager.

Personal life
He is the older brother of fellow footballers Tomi and Sammy.
His father, Dr John Ameobi, is a pastor in Newcastle Apostolic church, a Pentecostal church. All of the Ameobi boys were brought up in the church and have a strong faith. Ameobi is on the board of reference for CSW, an organisation working for religious freedom through advocacy and human rights.

International career
Nigerian-born Ameobi had a three-year spell with England's under-21 team, netting seven goals between 2000 and 2003. Ameobi is the joint eighth highest goal scorer for the under-21s.

In late 2009, Ameobi declared his interest in playing for Nigeria. On 14 January 2011, he was announced in the Nigerian national squad for the first time, for a friendly against Guatemala in the United States, in February. He withdrew from the replacement game against Sierra Leone after breaking his cheekbone in a Premier League match.

On 1 November 2011, it was announced that FIFA had cleared Ameobi to play for Nigeria.

In October 2012, Nigeria head coach Stephen Keshi expressed his interest in Ameobi joining the squad for the 2013 Africa Cup of Nations.

In November 2012, Ameobi received his second call-up for the Nigeria national team against Venezuela. He made his debut on 14 November, appearing as a substitute in the 60th minute for former Newcastle teammate Obafemi Martins. In stoppage time at the end of the game, Ameobi laid on a pass for Ogenyi Onazi to make the score 3–1 to Nigeria.

He scored his first international goal for Nigeria on 10 September 2013, against Burkina Faso in a friendly in Kaduna, Nigeria. In November 2013, he scored his second goal against Italy, in a friendly at Craven Cottage.

On 12 May 2014, he was named in Nigeria's 30-man provisional squad for the 2014 FIFA World Cup, and later made the final 23-man squad. During the tournament, Ameobi made a total of two substitute appearances for the Super Eagles, failing to score in either and ultimately seeing out his side's 2–0 exit to France as an unused substitute.

Career statistics

Club
Scource:

International

Honours
Newcastle United
EFL Championship: 2009–10
UEFA Intertoto Cup: 2006
Individual
'Wor Jackie' Award: 2000–01

References

External links

1981 births
Living people
People from Zaria
Nigerian footballers
Nigeria international footballers
English footballers
England under-21 international footballers
Black British sportsmen
English people of Nigerian descent
Naturalised citizens of the United Kingdom
Association football forwards
Newcastle United F.C. players
Stoke City F.C. players
Gaziantep F.K. footballers
Crystal Palace F.C. players
Bolton Wanderers F.C. players
Fleetwood Town F.C. players
Notts County F.C. players
Premier League players
English Football League players
Nigerian emigrants to the United Kingdom
2014 FIFA World Cup players
English expatriate footballers
Nigerian expatriate footballers
English expatriate sportspeople in Turkey
Nigerian expatriate sportspeople in Turkey
Expatriate footballers in Turkey
Nigerian Christians
English Christians
Shola